Klossner is an unincorporated community in Lafayette Township, Nicollet County, Minnesota, United States, near New Ulm.  The community is located near the junction of Nicollet County Road 5 and State Highway 15 (MN 15).  Fritsche Creek flows nearby.

Klossner was platted in 1897, and named for its founder, Jacob Klossner. A post office had been in operation at Klossner since 1896 but was closed on May 1, 1985.

References

Unincorporated communities in Nicollet County, Minnesota
Unincorporated communities in Minnesota